In Search of Sunrise 8: South Africa is a compilation album by Dutch trance producer Richard Durand. It was released on 10 May 2010 by SongBird. It is the eight installment in the In Search of Sunrise compilation series, and the first not to be mixed by Tiësto, the founder of the series in 1999. On 6 May 2010 Richard Durand released a 12-minute teaser preview of the compilation on SoundCloud.

Track listing

References

External links 
 In Search of Sunrise 8: South Africa at Black Hole Official Online Store
 

Electronic compilation albums
2010 compilation albums